Savarapu Vijaya Kumar (born 30 May 1966) is an Indian Drugs Control Administration officer, Ministry of Health and Family Welfare, Government of Andhra Pradesh, presently working as Assistant Director, Guntur District. He wrote books on Drugs and Cosmetics Act, 1940 and Drugs and Cosmetics Rules, 1945. He also developed E-governance Project on Drugs Inspectors Office in March 2005.

In December, 2017 Vijay Kumar lead the operation with his team and disclosed the fake medicines racket with machinery of worth INR. 3 crore in Roorkee, Uttarakhand. The main accused sold drugs of INR. 4 crore.

Early life and career
Vijaya Kumar was born in Mandapeta village of East Godavari district of Andhra Pradesh State. He graduated from University College of Pharmaceutical Sciences, Andhra University, Vishakhapatnam. He joined the Drugs Control Administration, Government of Andhra Pradesh in the year 1992 as Drugs Inspector.

In March 2005 Vijay Kumar developed E-governance Project on Drugs Inspectors Office and inaugurated by C.Dothunga, IPS, Director General, Drugs and Copy Right and made available the said project in the form of Compact disc. CD was released by former Chief Minister of Andhra Pradesh Y. S. Rajasekhara Reddy to all the chemist in the Eluru region and distributed by the Eluru Chemists and Druggists Association.

In July 2005 Vijay successfully established the Drug Information and Training Center for e-Governance at Koyyalagudem, West Godavari district.

In 2018, Vijay and his team crackdown spurious drug racket in Vijayawada. Spurious drug rackets were spread to all major cities in the country.

Awards and achievements
Uttam Seva Award for best performance of the year 2017-2018
Commendation Certificate 2018 by Central Drugs Standard Control Organization
National Intellectual property award, 2019
services provided in covid-19 pandemic supplied sanitizers,  masks, remdesivir injections which are shortage at that difficult time.
black fungus management and supply of medicines on emergency handled.    
conducted digital show and social campaign on drugs law organised on the occasion of azadi ka amrit mahostav
conducted blood donation camps on 2022 and raise awareness of drug laws through social media
conducted interaction classes to pharmacists 
huge photo gallery displayed in eluru DCA office on achievements of drug department 
organised many seminars, workshops, rallies.

Bibliography
Book on Case Law on Drugs and Cosmetics Act 1940 and Rules 1945 in 2000
Book on Drugs and Cosmetics Act 1940 and Rules 1945 in 2002

References

1966 births
Living people